The 2018–19 MRF Challenge Formula 2000 Championship was the sixth running of the MRF Challenge Formula 2000 Championship. It began on 16 November 2018 at the Dubai Autodrome in Dubai, United Arab Emirates and finished on 10 February 2019 at the Madras Motor Race Track in Chennai, India. The series comprised 15 races spread across three meetings. The 2018–19 season saw Britain's Jamie Chadwick become the first female champion of the series.

Drivers
The following drivers contested the championship:

Calendar and results

Championship standings

Scoring system

Drivers' standings